Presenting the Gerry Mulligan Sextet is an album led by American jazz baritone saxophonist Gerry Mulligan featuring tracks recorded in 1955 and released on the EmArcy label.

Reception

Allmusic awarded the album 4 stars calling it "Fun swinging music that is still quite accessible".

Track listing
All compositions by Gerry Mulligan except as indicated
 "Mud Bug" (Jerry Lloyd) - 5:03   
 "Sweet and Lovely" (Gus Arnheim, Harry Tobias, Jules LeMare) - 2:40   
 "Apple Core" - 5:23   
 "Nights on the Turntable" - 4:33   
 "Broadway" (Billy Byrd, Teddy McRae, Henri Woode)  - 6:31   
 "Everything Happens to Me" (Matt Dennis, Tom Adair) - 5:18   
 "The Lady Is a Tramp" (Richard Rodgers, Lorenz Hart) - 5:00   
 "Bernie's Tune" (Bernie Miller, Jerry Leiber, Mike Stoller) - 6:37    
Recorded in New York City on September 21, (tracks 1 & 8), October 22 (tracks 2 & 3) and October 31 (tracks 4-7), 1955

Personnel 
Gerry Mulligan - baritone saxophone
Jon Eardley - trumpet 
Bob Brookmeyer - valve trombone, piano on track 6
Zoot Sims - tenor saxophone 
Peck Morrison - bass
Dave Bailey  - drums

References 

1955 albums
Gerry Mulligan albums
EmArcy Records albums